The Anglican Diocese of Osun North East is one of 17 within the Anglican Province of Ibadan, it is one of the 14 provinces within the Church of Nigeria. The Diocese is inaugurated in 2009. The first Bishop is Rt. Rev. Humphrey Bamisebi Olumakaiye, who was succeeded in 2019 by  Rt. Rev. Ebenezer Akorede Okuyelu.

The Bishop court is located at Bishop Olumakaiye City, Otan Ayegbaju, Osun State.

The Cathedral is located at Ikotun Street, Otan Ayegbaju, Osun State.

Notes

Church of Nigeria dioceses
Dioceses of the Province of Ibadan